The Veera Prathapa is a non titular national honour of Sri Lanka awarded "for acts of bravery of the highest order". Veera Prathapa ranks lower than Sri Lanka Thilaka.

Awardees
Awardees include:

1998
 Cprl. R. P. R. Wickramapala 
 O. R. A. K. Perera
 Amithapala Weerasinghe

2017
 Aluth Gedara Ranjith Amarajeewa
 Rankoth Gedara Shanaka Prasad Kumara

References

External links

Civil awards and decorations of Sri Lanka